Adriaan Poirters (baptised 2 November 1605, in the Sint-Petrus'-Bandenkerk in Oisterwijk – died 4 July 1674, Mechelen) was a Dutch Jesuit poet and prose writer who was active in the Counter Reformation.

External links
http://www.dbnl.nl/auteurs/auteur.php?id=poir001

1605 births
1674 deaths
17th-century Jesuits
17th-century Dutch poets
People from Oisterwijk
Dutch male poets
17th-century male writers